Ann (born 27 September 1991) is a Taiwanese singer-songwriter. She released her debut album, Catcher in the Rye, in 2012. She has been publishing her songs on the internet since 2008 and was later discovered and signed by B'in Music, a major record label in Taiwan. Her family is from Manchuria.

Biography
Ann was born in Taipei, Taiwan and started learning musical instruments, including guitar and keyboard instruments, while attending Muzha Elementary School in Taipei. She also joined the school's choir. At 13, she became interested in the creation of music, and she began publishing musical works on the online platform Streetvoice at the age of 16. In 2008, she performed at the Simple Life Festival and was discovered by musical artist Jonathan Lee, who was serving as a panel judge at the event. In 2012, she released her first album Catcher in the Rye to a positive reception within the Chinese-language music sphere, with Jacky Cheung and Alan Tam publicly praising her for the uniqueness of her voice and for her creative talent. In 2013, she was nominated for the Best New Artist category in the 24th Golden Melody Awards for this album. On December 14, 2018, Ann released her third album 1990s after a gap of 4 years. In October 2019, Ann released an extended play recording entitled 44 Days.

Discography
The Catcher in the Rye (麥田捕手), released 21 December 2012
What's Next? (接下來是什麼), released 5 September 2014
1990s , released 14 December 2018
44 Days (EP) (44天), released 29 October 2019
All About You (没有人写歌给你过吧), released 31 August 2022

References

 金曲獎／新人獎競爭激烈！白安、艾怡良謝評審 家家激動落淚__娛樂新聞_Yes娛樂

External links
 
 
 
Ann's StreetVoice Channel  
Ann's blog 

1991 births
Living people
Musicians from Taipei
21st-century Taiwanese singers
21st-century Taiwanese women singers
Manchu singers